Langis Côté (born 15 June 1965) is a Canadian weightlifter. He competed in the men's lightweight event at the 1988 Summer Olympics.

References

1965 births
Living people
Canadian male weightlifters
Olympic weightlifters of Canada
Weightlifters at the 1988 Summer Olympics
Sportspeople from Saguenay, Quebec
Commonwealth Games medallists in weightlifting
Commonwealth Games bronze medallists for Canada
Pan American Games medalists in weightlifting
Pan American Games bronze medalists for Canada
Weightlifters at the 1987 Pan American Games
Weightlifters at the 1986 Commonwealth Games
20th-century Canadian people
21st-century Canadian people
Medallists at the 1986 Commonwealth Games